Papi Juancho is the fifth studio album by Colombian singer-songwriter Maluma. It was surprise-released on 21 August 2020 by Sony Music Latin. The album features guest appearances from Randy, Yandel, Yomo, Lenny Tavárez, Justin Quiles, Ñengo Flow, Jory Boy, Ñejo & Dalmata, and Darell, and was supported by the singles "ADMV", "Hawái" and "Parce". The album is supported by the Papi Juancho Tour, with concerts starting in September 2021.

The album debuted at number 34 on the US Billboard 200 and number 2 on the Top Latin Albums chart with first week sales of 16,000.

Track listing

Personnel
Credits adapted from Tidal.

 The Rude Boyz - production (1-6, 8-11, 13-16, 18, 20)
 Édgar Barerra - production (19, 21, 22)
 Keityn - production (3, 4)
 Ily Wonder - production (3, 9)
 Nyal - production (12, 22)
 Teo Grajales - production (1)
 Jowan - production (3)
 Alejandro Suárez - production (6)
 Madmusick - production (7)
 Lil Geniuz - production (16)
 Yanyo the Secret Panda - production (16)
 Tezzel - production (17)
 The Prodigiez - production (19)

Charts

Weekly charts

Year-end charts

Certifications

References

2020 albums
Maluma albums
Sony Music Latin albums
Spanish-language albums
Surprise albums